Martin Carbaugh (born October 28, 1979) is an American politician who has served in the Indiana House of Representatives from the 81st district since 2012.

References

1979 births
Living people
Republican Party members of the Indiana House of Representatives
21st-century American politicians